Wacton is a small village and civil parish in the county of Herefordshire, England, and  north-west from Bromyard.

In a field are remains of a motte and moat; buried foundations are all that remain of stone defences.

References

External links

Villages in Herefordshire